The Perijá tapaculo (Scytalopus perijanus) is a species of passerine bird in the family Rhinocryptidae (tapaculos). Specimens have long been stored in museums, but the species was described only in 2015 based on sixteen specimens found between July 2008 and February 2009. It is considered vulnerable to extinction.

Adults have neutral grey heads, brown necks, brown-sepia striped backs, and grey-white bellies, breasts, and throats. Males have some buff markings on their breasts, and less sharp brown spots on their napes than females. The Perijá tapaculo is a secretive bird and therefore difficult to observe; as a result its ecology is poorly known. It feeds on insects and reproduces between April and July. Its range is partially within Chamicero de Perijá Bird Reserve in Colombia and the Sierra de Perijá National Park in Venezuela.

Taxonomy
Tapaculos are the most primitive family of suboscines, divided into 12 genera containing 60 species. Scytalopus, the genus to which the Perijá tapaculo belongs, has an abundance of similar species, many of which are difficult to classify through appearance. Some individual species from other genera are like Scytalopus in size and plumage, but have different behaviour and morphological features. Vocal studies and mitochondrial DNA analysis are often used to differentiate between species within the genus; a number of visually identical species previously classified as subspecies of the Magellanic tapaculo (S. magellanicus) have been identified through these methods, and the majority of subspecies within the genus have subsequently been reclassified as separate species.

Between 1941 and 1942, American ornithologist Melbourne Armstrong Carriker collected 27 specimens of the Perijá tapaculo in six locations on the western side of the Serranía del Perijá. He identified them as specimens of the white-crowned tapaculo (S. atratus), despite size and colour differences, and sent them to the National Museum of Natural History in Washington, D.C. In 1953, the specimens began to attract the attention of biologists, and were successively identified as the brown-rumped tapaculo (S. latebricola), the Caracas tapaculo (S. caracae), and the Mérida tapaculo (S. meridanus). Some further believed that the specimens could belong to an undescribed species, or constitute a subspecies of the pale-bellied tapaculo (S. griseicollis) or the Mérida tapaculo based on morphological studies, but they were never classified as any of these.

Between July 2008 and February 2009, sixteen new specimens were collected in an area previously explored by Carriker. New vocal, morphological, genetic, and ecological studies of these specimens confirmed that they constituted a new species, Scytalopus perijanus, first described by Jorge Enrique Avendaño et al. on 11 March 2015 following a three-year expedition, and accepted by the South American Classification Committee. The Latin word perijanus refers to the Serranía del Perijá mountain range, and the genus name Scytalopus comes from the Greek skutale (stick) and pous (foot).

Avendaño lured the specimen by playing a recording of its song on 10 July 2008 at the edge of a montane forest. Sequence analysis of the mitochondrial gene ND2 from the Perijá tapaculo showed that its nearest relatives are the brown-rumped tapaculo, Caracas tapaculo, and Mérida tapaculo.

Description

The Perijá tapaculo is a small bird,  in length with an average mass of 17 to 18 grams (about 0.6 oz).

The forehead, lores, crown, mantle, and scapular area are a neutral grey colour. There is a brown spot on the nape. The top of the tail is brown, and the bottom is faintly striped brown. The bird's back and rump are striped brown-sepia, and the throat, breast, and belly are grey-white. Its lower belly and flanks are tawny. The iris is dark brown. Male specimens are distinguished by having less sharp brown spots on their napes, and the bottom of their breasts are mixed with a pale buff colour. The legs are brown on the back and whitish on the front. Young birds have a yellowish appearance with striped brown flanks.

The bird's plumage colouration is most similar to the pale-bellied tapaculo. The S. g. morenoi subspecies of the pale-bellied tapaculo can be differentiated from the Perijá tapaculo by its entirely brown back and nape, and its different calls. Juveniles of this subspecies have a dull ventral plumage, while the Perijá tapaculo has a more yellow plumage. It also resembles the Caracas tapaculo but has a duller ventral colour.

Ecology and behaviour

Like other species in genus Scytalopus, the Perijá tapaculo is secretive and therefore difficult to observe. The call and song differ from those of most other species in the genus, and the latter is composed of two short churrs repeating up to 65 times at 0.5 to 3 second intervals. The diet of the species is little known, but studies of the stomach contents of seven specimens suggested that they fed exclusively on insects.

Little is known about the reproduction of the species, but it is believed to nest between April and July. Young birds may leave the nest at the end of June. Like those of other Scytalopus species, male specimens have demonstrated involvement in parenting.

Distribution and habitat

The Perijá tapaculo is endemic to the Serranía del Perijá, a mountain range on the Colombia–Venezuela border known for its high rates of endemism.

Some specimens have been observed feeding in dense thickets within  of the ground, often near the forest. Others have been observed running among bushes through open grassy areas.

The species has not been identified as being sympatric with any other species of the genus Scytalopus.

Threats and protection
Avendaño et al. wrote in the original description of the Perijá tapaculo that the size and quality of the species' range are being reduced, although it can tolerate a certain level of fragmentation of its range. The description entails the International Union for Conservation of Nature (IUCN) classification of this species as near threatened. The authors believe that to protect the Perijá tapaculo, conservation measures on the Colombian side of the border should be implemented, as the forests of the Serranía del Perijá have been largely destroyed on the Colombian side by logging activities and forest clearance for agriculture.

On 28 January 2014, prior to the formal description of the bird, the Chamicero de Perijá Bird Reserve was created by Fundación ProAves to maintain one of Colombia's most fragile habitats. In addition to the Perijá tapaculo, several other Perijá-endemic endangered species, such as the Perijá metaltail (Metallura iracunda) and Perijá thistletail (Asthenes perijana) are protected within this reserve's . The Colombian section of the Serranía del Perijá is dangerous for scientific excursions due to the presence of the FARC guerrilla group in the region.

References

Citations

General bibliography

External links
 

Perijá tapaculo
Birds of the Serranía del Perijá
Páramo fauna
Perijá tapaculo
Articles containing video clips